The third USS Shubrick (DD-268) was a  in the United States Navy. The destroyer was later transferred to the Royal Navy, where she served as HMS Ripley (G79) during World War II.

Service history

As USS Shubrick

Named for William Shubrick, she was laid down on 3 June 1918 by the Bethlehem Shipbuilding Corporation, Squantum, Massachusetts; launched on 31 December 1918; sponsored by Mrs. Thomas A. Bayard, granddaughter of Rear Admiral Shubrick; and commissioned on 3 July 1919.

After shakedown out of Newport, Rhode Island, Shubrick departed New York on 27 October 1919, carrying currency and diplomatic representatives to Port-au-Prince, Haiti. After completing this mission on 31 October, she continued to the west coast, where she arrived on 27 November. On arrival at San Diego, she joined a reserve destroyer division; and, after conducting infrequent exercises off San Diego, Shubrick was decommissioned on 8 June 1922.

Shubrick was recommissioned on 18 December 1939 at San Diego, shortly after the outbreak of World War II. She refitted at Mare Island from 26 February to 16 March 1940 and departed San Diego for the Atlantic on 22 March. She was stationed in the Caribbean until 29 June, and formed part of the West Gulf Patrol from 13 to 22 May. From 2 July to 30 August, she trained Naval Reservists from Miami, Florida, Boston, Massachusetts and New York. She then underwent repairs at New York and Norfolk, Virginia and departed the latter port on 6 November for Halifax, Nova Scotia.

As HMS Ripley

She arrived at Halifax on 21 November, was decommissioned on 26 November, and simultaneously commissioned in the British Navy as HMS Ripley. Shubrick was struck from the Navy List on 8 January 1941. HMS Ripley was modified for trade convoy escort service by removal of three of the original 4-inch/50-caliber guns and three of the triple torpedo tube mounts to reduce topside weight for additional depth charge stowage and installation of hedgehog.  Ripley was assigned to Escort Group B-7 of the Mid-Ocean Escort Force for convoy ON 142 during the winter of 1942–43 and served on North Atlantic convoy routes until placed in reserve in January 1944. She was scrapped on 20 March 1945 at Sunderland, England.

Notes

References

External links
http://www.navsource.org/archives/05/268.htm

Clemson-class destroyers
Ships built in Quincy, Massachusetts
1918 ships
Ships transferred from the United States Navy to the Royal Navy
Town-class destroyers of the Royal Navy
Town-class destroyers converted from Clemson-class destroyers
World War II destroyers of the United Kingdom